Erua is a small town on the North Island Central Plateau in New Zealand. The town is located on New Zealand State Highway 4 immediately to the south of the town of National Park. The town is administered by the Ruapehu District Council and falls within the National Park Ward.

It abuts the Erua Forest, a  area managed by the Department of Conservation. The Erua Forest includes Tawa, Rimu, Miro and Totara trees.

The New Zealand Ministry for Culture and Heritage explains that Erua means "two", from the Māori word "rua" for "two" and the prefix "e" which is used for numbers between two and nine.

Hunting is permitted in the Erua Forest. Pollen analysis was done on samples from the Erua Swamp.  The area includes a singletrack bicycle trail.

Erua is a rural settlement bordered by protected forestland and is used as a base for exploring the area. The state protected forest was established in 1930.

See also
 Mount Ruapehu
Erua railway station

References

Geography of Manawatū-Whanganui
Populated places in Manawatū-Whanganui
Ruapehu District